Antiochian Greek Christians (also known as Antiochian Rūm) are a Levantine Arabic-speaking ethnoreligious Eastern Christian group residing in the Levant region. They are either members of the Greek Orthodox Church of Antioch or the Melkite Greek Catholic Church, and they have ancient roots in the Levant, more specifically, the territories of western Syria, northern and central Lebanon, Palestine, western Jordan, and the southern Turkish province of Hatay, which includes the city of Antakya (ancient Antioch)—one of the holiest cities in Eastern Christianity. Many of their descendants now live in the global Near Eastern Christian diaspora. With Arabic becoming the lingua franca in the Levant, they primarily speak Levantine.

History

Early Era 
Syria was invaded by Greek king Alexander the Great in 333 B.C. and Antioch was founded by one of his generals, Seleucus I Nicator.

Roman Era 
Syria was annexed by the Roman Republic in 64 B.C., by Pompey in the Third Mithridatic War. Christianity spread in the region and dominated by the fourth century.

Byzantine Era 
Throughout the Middle Ages, Antiochians, as well as other Byzantine Greeks, self-identified as Romaioi or Romioi (Greek: Ῥωμαῖοι, Ρωμιοί, meaning "Romans") and Graikoi (Γραικοί, meaning "Greeks"). Linguistically, they spoke Byzantine or Medieval Greek, known as "Romaic," which is situated between the Hellenistic (Koine) and modern phases of the language. Antiochians perceived themselves as the descendants of Classical Greeks, the political heirs of imperial Rome, and followers of the Apostles. Thus, their sense of "Romanity" was different from that of their contemporaries in the West. "Romaic" was the name of the vulgar Greek language, as opposed to "Hellenic" which was its literary or doctrinal form.

The homeland of the Antiochians, known as the Diocese of the East, was one of the major commercial, agricultural, religious, and intellectual areas of the Empire, and its strategic location facing the Sassanid Empire and the unruly desert tribes gave it exceptional military importance. The entire area of the former diocese came under Sassanid occupation between 609 and 628, but was retaken by the Emperor Heraclius until it was lost to the Arabs after the Battle of Yarmouk, and the fall of Antioch.

Arab Conquest 
Further Information:Muslim conquest of the Levant, Arab–Byzantine wars

The Arab conquest of Syria (Arabic: الفتح العربي لبلاد الشام) occurred in the first half of the 7th century, and refers to the conquest of the Levant, which later became known as the Islamic Province of Bilad al-Sham. On the eve of the Arab Muslim conquests the Byzantines were still in the process of rebuilding their authority in the Levant, which had been lost to them for almost twenty years. At the time of the Arab conquest, Bilad al-Sham was inhabited mainly by Syrian Christian sects, Ghassanid and other local Arab tribes and Nabatean Arabs, as well as Greeks, and by non-Christian minorities of Jews, Samaritans, and Itureans Arabs. The population of the region did not become predominantly Muslim  identity until nearly a millennium after the conquest.

In Southern Levant 
The Muslim Arab army attacked Jerusalem, held by the Byzantines, in November, 636. For four months the siege continued. Ultimately, the Orthodox Patriarch of Jerusalem, Sophronius, agreed to surrender Jerusalem to Caliph Umar in person. Caliph Umar, then at Medina, agreed to these terms and traveled to Jerusalem to sign the capitulation in the spring of 637. Sophronius also negotiated a pact with Caliph Umar, known as the Umariyya Covenant or Covenant of Omar, allowing for religious freedom for Christians in exchange for jizya, a tax to be paid by conquered non-Muslims, called 'Ahl al Dhimmah'. While the majority population of Jerusalem during the time of Arab conquest was Christian, the majority of Palestine's population, according to contemporary Israeli references, about 300,000–400,000 inhabitants, was still Jewish. In the aftermath the process of Islamization took place, combining immigration to Palestine with the adoption of Arabic as the official language, and conversion of a part of the local Christian population to Islam.

Rashidun Caliphate
According to the historian James William Parkes, during the 1st century after the Arab conquest (640–740), the caliph and governors of Syria and the Holy Land ruled entirely over Christian and Jewish subjects. He further states that apart from the Bedouin in the earliest days, the only Arabs west of the Jordan were the garrisons. The Arab garrisons were kept apart in camps, and life went on much as before for the local population. The taxes instituted were the kharaj—a tax that landowners and peasants paid according to the productivity of their fields—as well as the jizya—paid by non-Muslims in return for protection under the Muslim state and exemption from military service. The Byzantine civil service was retained until a new system could be instituted; therefore, Greek remained the administrative language in the new Muslim territories for over 50 years after the conquests.

Umayyad Caliphate
The relations between the Muslims and the Christians in the state were good. The Umayyads were involved in frequent battles with the Byzantine Greeks without being concerned with protecting themselves in Syria, which had remained largely Christian like many other parts of the empire. Prominent positions were held by Christians, some of whom belonged to families that had served in Byzantine governments. The employment of Christians was part of a broader policy of religious tolerance that was necessitated by the presence of large Christian populations in the conquered provinces, as in Syria. This policy also boosted Muawiya's popularity and solidified Syria as his power base.

Abbasid Caliphate

In 969, the Patriarch of Jerusalem, John VII, was put to death for treasonable correspondence with the Byzantine Greeks. As Jerusalem grew in importance to Muslims and pilgrimages increased, tolerance for other religions declined. Christians were persecuted. Churches were destroyed. The sixth Fatimid caliph, Caliph Al-Hakim (996–1021), who was believed to be "God made manifest" by the Druze, destroyed the Holy Sepulchre in 1009. This powerful provocation started the near 90-year preparation towards the First Crusade.

Ottoman Period 
Historically, Antiochians were considered as part of the Rum Millet (millet-i Rûm), or "Roman nation" by the Ottoman authorities.

Greek War of Independence
As soon as the Greek revolution commenced, Rûm throughout the Empire were targeted for persecutions, and Syria did not escape Ottoman Turkish wrath. Fearing that the Rûm of Syria might aid the Greek Revolution, the Porte issued an order that they should be disarmed. In Jerusalem, the city's Christian population, who were estimated to make up around 20% of the city's total (with the majority being Rûm), were also forced by the Ottoman authorities to relinquish their weapons, wear black, and help improve the city's fortifications. Greek Orthodox holy sites, such as the Monastery of Our Lady of Balamand, located just south of the city of Tripoli in Lebanon, were subjected to vandalism and revenge attacks, which in fact forced the monks to abandon it until 1830. Not even the Greek Orthodox Patriarch was safe, as orders were received just after the execution of the Ecumenical Patriarchate in Constantinople to kill the Antiochian Patriarch as well; however, local officials failed to execute the orders.

On March 18, 1826, a flotilla of around fifteen Greek ships led by Vasos Mavrovouniotis attempted to spread the Greek Revolution to the Ottoman Levant. According to then-British Consul John Barker, stationed in Aleppo, in a memo to British Ambassador Stratford Canning, in Constantinople. The Greek Revolutionaries landed in Beirut, but were thwarted by a local Mufti and a hastily arranged defense force. Although initially repelled, the Greeks did manage to hold on to a small portion of the city near the seashore in an area inhabited by local Rûm. During which they appealed to the Rûm "to rise up and join them", and even sent an invitation to the chief of the local Druzes to also join the Revolution. A few days later, on March 23, 1826, the regional governor Abdullah Pasha sent his lieutenant and nearly 500 Albanian irregular forces to exact revenge for the failed uprising.

Aleppo Massacre of 1850
On October 17–18, 1850 Muslim rioters attacked the Christian neighborhoods of Aleppo. In the aftermath, Ottoman records show that 688 homes, 36 shops, and 6 churches were damaged, including the Greek Catholic patriarchate and its library. The events led hundreds of Christians to migrate mainly to Beirut and Smyrna.

Damascus Massacre of 1860

On July 10, 1860, Saint Joseph of Damascus and 11,000 Antiochian Greek Orthodox and Catholic Christians were killed when Muslim marauders destroyed part of the old city of Damascus. The Antiochians had taken refuge in the churches and monasteries of Bab Tuma ("Saint Thomas' Gate"). The Massacre was a part of the 1860 Mount Lebanon civil war, which began as a Maronite rebellion in Mount Lebanon, and culminated in the massacre in Damascus.

First World War and the Ottoman Greek genocide
During the First World War, Antiochians, alongside other Ottoman Greeks, were targeted by the Ittihadist Ottoman authorities in what is now historically known as the Ottoman Greek genocide. As a result, three Antiochian Greek Orthodox Dioceses were completely annihilated; the Metropolis of Tarsus and Adana, the Metropolis of Amida, and the Metropolis of Theodosioupolis. Those Antiochians living outside of the French Mandate for Syria and the Lebanon were subject to the forced population exchange of 1923, which ended the Ottoman Greek genocide. One modern Greek town, which is made up of Antiochian survivors from the population exchange, is Nea Selefkia, which is located in Epirus. The founders of Nea Selefkia were refugees from Silifke in Cilicia.

Modern
After the Syrian province of Alexandretta was given to Turkey by the French Mandate powers in 1939, many Antiochian Greek Christians migrated to Syria and Lebanon. Following the 1960s, a new wave of immigration has drawn Antiochian Greek Christians to Western countries in particular to the United States, Canada, and Australia.

Population 

The highest concentration of Antiochian Greek Christians still living in the Levant are found within the territories of Syria, Lebanon, and Turkey. Counting the worldwide diaspora, there are more than 1.5 million Antiochian Greek Orthodox and Greek Catholic (Melkite) Christians residing in the northern Middle East, the United States, Canada, Australia and Latin America today.

Near East 
In Syria, the Antiochian Greek Christians are mostly concentrated in Wadi al-Nasara (The Valley of the Christians), as well as the surrounding areas, such as the cities of Mhardeh, Hama, and Homs. Smaller and historical communities can also be found in Aleppo, Damascus, and Latakia. The Greek Orthodox population of Syria is about 1,142,500 people. The Melkite Greek Catholic Church numbers between 118,000 and 240,000 members.

In Lebanon, most Antiochian Greek Christians can be found in the Nabatieh, Matn District, Beqaa Governorate, and North Governorates. Specifically in the Koura District, Zahlé, and Akkar. The Lebanese Greek Orthodox constitute 8% of the total population of Lebanon and the Melkite Catholic Christians are believed to constitute about 5% of the total population of Lebanon.

There are 135,000 or more Christian Arabs in Israel (and more than 39,000 non-Arab Christians). As of 2014 the Melkite Greek Catholic Church was the largest Christian community in Israel, where about 60% of Israeli Christians belonged to the Melkite Greek Catholic Church, while around 30% of Israeli Christians belonged to the Greek Orthodox Church of Jerusalem.

The Jordanian Greek Orthodox Christians are believed to number 120,000, most of whom are Arabic speaking, or by some accounts more than 300,000. There are currently 29 Greek Orthodox churches – with that number on the increase – which come under the Jerusalem Patriarchate. The Melkites count 27,000 in Jordan.
According to an ethnographic study published by Alexander Synvet in 1878, there were 125,000 Greek Orthodox Christians living in Syria, Lebanon, and Palestine, as well as another 35,000 Greek Catholics.

While those able to remain in Turkey are concentrated in the Hatay Province, a significant number of Antiochian Greek Christians have migrated to Istanbul. They now live in Antioch, Mersin, İskenderun, the villages of Altınözü and Tokacli, a string of villages in Samandağ, and the seaside town of Arsuz. A case of intercommunal violence with Turkish Muslims in Altınözü was reported in 2005. The events were allegedly sparked by sexual harassment of a Christian girl by a Muslim barber's apprentice.

Americas 
Important communities of Greek Catholic Melkites live in South America, mostly in Brazil and Argentina. The Eparhy of Nossa Senhora do Paraiso em São Paulo has a total membership of 443,000 people recorded in Brazil; and the Apostolic Exarchate of Argentina, 310,700. Venezuela has 26,600 people recorded and Mexico 4,700. 

In North America Catholic Melkites total 60,000,  and the membership of the Greek Orthodox is about 500,000 people.

The homeland of the Greek Orthodox is mostly Syria where it has the highest population of Christians and Lebanon. But like the Catholic Melkites, the largest population live in the Americas. The Antiochian Greek Orthodox population of Latin America is about 2.5 million people, while the Antiochian Greek Orthodox population of North America is about 450,000.

Oceania 
The Catholic Melkite community exist in Australia, with 53,700 members. In Australia and New Zealand the Greek Orthodox Melkites number about 43,500—or according to the Prime Minister's estimate in 2007–123,000 members.

Europe 
In Europe, there are about 40,000 people.

Genetics and ethnicity 

The designation "Greek" refers to the use of Koine Greek in liturgy, not to ethnicity; most Antiochian Greek Christians identify themselves as native to the Arabic-speaking Levant region.

According to Greek historian Pavlos Karolidis writing in 1908, they are a mixture of ancient Greek settlers and particularly Macedonians, Roman-era Greeks, and Byzantine Greeks ("Rûm"), as well as indigenous Levantines. Karolidis was attempting to refute the Russian claims that they were of Aramaic origin. They were included as Greeks in an ethnographic study published by French historian and ethnographer Alexander Synvet in 1878.

A genetic study focused on the Maronites of Lebanon revealed no noticeable or significant genetic differentiation between the Greek Orthodox Christians, Maronites, Greek Catholic Christians, Sunni Muslims, Shiite Muslims, and Druze of the region. But Ruffié and Taleb (1965) found significant differences of blood markers between ethno-religious groups, particularly the Greek Orthodox in Lebanon, based on a substantially larger sample of Greek Orthodox and Greek Catholic individuals within a broader research project—but their research ignored other related 'Melkite-Antiochian' Greek Orthodox and Greek Catholic communities in Syria, Southeastern Turkey and Northern Israel. A study by Makhoul et al. (2010) on Beta Thalassemia Heterogeneity in Lebanon found out that the thalassemia mutations in Lebanese Christians are similar to the ones observed in Macedonia, Greece which "may confirm the presumed Macedonian [Greek] origin of certain Lebanese Christians".

Notable people
Nassim Nicholas Taleb – Lebanese-American essayist, scholar, statistician, former trader and risk analyst

Historical people
Saint Domnius, Bishop of Salona and patron saint of Split
George of Antioch
Ignatius of Antioch, Patriarch of Antioch
John Chrysostom (349–407) Patriarch of Constantinople
Saint Luke, 1st century AD, Christian evangelist and author of the Gospel of St. Luke and Acts of the Apostles
Aulus Licinius Archias, poet
Paul of Samosata

See also 
 Greek Orthodox Church of Antioch
Christianity in Lebanon
 Christianity in Syria
 Eastern Orthodoxy in Syria
 Eastern Orthodoxy in Turkey
 Melkite Greek Catholic Church
 Arab Christians
 Antioch
 List of Greek Orthodox Antiochian Churches in Europe

References

Sources

Further reading